Adam Arcuragi is an American-born artist and producer from Georgia, who lived in Philadelphia, Pennsylvania, for many years.  He is credited with being the founder of the musical genre Death Gospel.

Adam's debut album (untitled) was praised for his complex and often introspective lyrics and his voice garnered comparisons to Nick Drake and Van Morrison.  Songs from the album were featured on stations and sites such as NPR's All Songs Considered.  In 2008, Arcuragi recorded a La Blogotheque/Take-Away Show in New York City and the same year released his EP 'Soldiers For Feet'.

Arcuragi released his second full-length album titled I am become joy in September 2009. The album included collaborations with singer Dawn Landes, Jesse Elliott of These United States. The backing vocals on I Am Become Joy were meant to sound like that of a "ramshackle choir as though each song was tracked in a different church across the wide swath of Route 80 that cuts from southern Georgia to Mississippi".

"Like A Fire That Consumes All Before It" was released on January 31, 2012, on Thirty Tigers.  The album premiered on NPR's "First Listen". Positive album reviews appeared on NPR, Paste, The Washington Post, The Huffington Post, Prefix, Impose, Time Out New York, The Portland Mercury and many others.

Arcuragi recorded an NPR Tiny Desk Concert with Bob Boilen, three Daytrotter Sessions, and toured extensively through the United States and Europe, under his name as well as with SPURS. Reviews, Interviews and articles appeared in Rolling Stone, Paste Magazine, American Songwriter, on NPR, in The L Magazine, Magnet, The Philadelphia Weekly and  The Washington Post, The Austin Chronicle,  The Guardian UK, Huffington Post and many others. He recorded a 78 Project that was featured on The BBC

Arcuragi has performed with legendary artists such as Ringo Starr  and Eric Burdon (of The Animals), and has also co-written several songs with renowned songwriter Jeff Barry.

Since moving to LA in 2014, Adam's musical interests expanded into production and songwriting. He has produced, co-written and collaborated with artists and artists Sondre Lerche, Laura Burhen (Mynabirds), HOLLOVVS, Katt and Fabian Simon.  Arcuragi has also written multiple songs for critically acclaimed shows such as SEARCH PARTY and THE PATH, and is one half of the project THE MOONLESS NIGHTS with Jesse Epstein.

He currently lives in Silver Lake, CA.

Discography
Untitled (2006)
Soldiers for Feet EP (2008)
I am become joy (2009)
Like A Fire That Consumes All Before It... (2012)
Untitled Album (Forthcoming 2018)

References

External links
www.adamarcuragi.com

Living people
Songwriters from Pennsylvania
Year of birth missing (living people)
Thirty Tigers artists